Parsonsia is a genus of woody vines in the family Apocynaceae. Species occur throughout Indomalaya, Australasia and Melanesia.

Description
The leaves are opposite, the shape and size of juvenile leaves often bearing little resemblance to the adult leaves. The latex may be clear and colourless, pale yellow or milky white. 
The flowers are green, white, cream, yellow, orange, red, pink or brown, sometimes with contrasting markings. These are followed by elongated pod-like capsules, the two follicles eventually separating to reveal numerous seeds with long, silky hairs.

Taxonomy
The genus was named and described in 1810 by botanist Robert Brown in his paper On the Asclepiadeae published in Memoirs of the Wernerian Natural History Society .  He named the genus in honour of James Parsons (1705–1770), an English physician and Fellow of the Royal Society.

The generic name Parsonsia R.Br. (1810) is conserved against  the earlier homonym  Parsonsia P.Browne which was given to a genus in the family Lythraceae. The latter genus is now included in Cuphea.

Parsonsia is closely related to  Artia and Prestonia.

Species

Accepted species

formerly included
 Parsonsia balansae Baill. = Artia balansae (Baill.) Pichon ex Guillaumin
 Parsonsia barbata Blume = Parameria laevigata (Juss.) Moldenke
 Parsonsia brachycarpa Baill. = Artia brachycarpa (Baill.) Boiteau
 Parsonsia bracteata Hook. & Arn. = Mandevilla pentlandiana (DC.) Woodson
 Parsonsia corymbosa (Jacq.) R.Br. ex Steud. = Pinochia corymbosa (Jacq.) M.E.Endress & B.F.Hansen
 Parsonsia diversifolia (Warb.) Markgr. = Lyonsia diversifolia Warb.
 Parsonsia floribunda (Sw.) R.Br. ex Steud. = Pinochia floribunda (Sw.) M.E.Endress & B.F.Hansen
 Parsonsia francii Guillaumin = Artia francii (Guillaumin) Pichon
 Parsonsia galeottiana Baill. = Thenardia galeottiana Baill.
 Parsonsia javanica Blume 1826 not (Blume) K. Schum 1895 = Urceola javanica (Blume) Boerl.
 Parsonsia leptocarpa Hook. & Arn. = Forsteronia leptocarpa (Hook. & Arn.) A.DC. 
 Parsonsia lifuana Baill. = Artia lifuana (Baill.) Pichon ex Guillaumin
 Parsonsia myrtifolia (Poir.) Roem. & Schult. = Landolphia myrtifolia (Poir.) Markgr.
 Parsonsia ovata Wall. ex G.Don = Pottsia laxiflora (Blume) Kuntze
 Parsonsia spicata (Jacq.) R.Br. ex Steud. = Forsteronia spicata (Jacq.) G.Mey.

Cultivation
A species from New Zealand, Parsonsia variablis (Variable-leaved Parsonsia), was introduced into cultivation in England in 1847 as a greenhouse plant and was noted to have a sweet scent, however the flowers were regarded as "not very showy". This species is thought to be a form of Parsonsia heterophylla.

References

 
Apocynaceae genera